António Jonet (30 June 1927 – 21 September 2007) was a Portuguese modern pentathlete. He competed at the 1952 Summer Olympics.

References

External links
 

1927 births
2007 deaths
Portuguese male modern pentathletes
Olympic modern pentathletes of Portugal
Modern pentathletes at the 1952 Summer Olympics